Reginald T. "Reg" Ferguson (born c. 1901) was a rugby union player who represented Australia.

Ferguson, a lock, was born in Sydney and claimed a total of 4 international rugby caps for Australia.

References

Australian rugby union players
Australia international rugby union players
Rugby union players from Sydney
Rugby union locks